The PBA Tournament of Champions is one of the five major PBA (Professional Bowlers Association) bowling events. It is an invitational event and the only PBA Tour major that does not have any open field. All participants must meet qualifications to be invited.

History

The inaugural event, held by the PBA in 1962, featured all 25 PBA Tour title-holders to date, and was won by PBA Hall of Famer Joe Joseph, who had qualified for the tournament only four events prior. In 1965, the tournament featured all champions since the 1962 event, before officially becoming an annual event in 1966 (at that time featuring the most recent 48 tour champions).

From 1965 to 1993, Firestone Tire sponsored the Tournament of Champions. Since 1994, the Tournament of Champions has had a variety of sponsors, including General Tire, Brunswick, Dexter, H&R Block, Barbasol, Fire Lake Casino & Resort, and most recently Kia.

From 1965 until 1994, the tournament was contested at Riviera Lanes (now AMF Riviera Lanes) in Fairlawn, Ohio near the long-time Firestone World Headquarters in Akron, Ohio. From 2002 to 2007, the Tournament of Champions was contested in an arena setting at Mohegan Sun Arena, in Uncasville, Connecticut. The event was moved to Las Vegas, Nevada for the 2007–08 season, and was contested there through the 2011–12 season. The tournament returned to Riviera Lanes again in 2018.

The TOC is the only PBA major that is an "invitational" event. Prior to 2007–08, a bowler qualified for the Tournament of Champions by being one of the 32 most recent title winners on the regular PBA Tour.  The list was expanded in 2008 to include some past winners of the TOC itself, even if they were no longer in the Top 32 most recent PBA winners. The 2009–10 TOC saw its first-ever female competitor, as a spot in the 2010 tournament was given to Kelly Kulick, winner of the inaugural PBA Women's World Championship in 2009.  Kulick made sports history on January 24, 2010 as she defeated Mika Koivuniemi and Chris Barnes to become the first woman to win a title against men on the PBA Tour.

In 2011–12, the tournament allowed PBA Regional Tour winners for the first time, even if they had no titles on the PBA Tour, as long as they were PBA members at the time of their Regional title. These players participated in the initial "Champions" field qualifying to gain a spot in the "Elite" field. After 20 games of qualifying, a limited number of Champions field players earned entry into the Elite Field, which consisted of 54 bowlers total (a combination of past PBA Tour champions, top players in Champions field qualifying, plus the previous year's TOC champion). All Elite field players cashed a minimum of $2,500.  After 16 more games in the Cashers' Round, the Top 24 (based on 36 total games) made the round-robin match play.  The Top 4 match play qualifiers then made the live televised finals.  Payouts for the TV finals were $250,000 for first, $100,000 for second, $50,000 for third and $40,000 for fourth. (See also: PBA Bowling Tour: 2010–11 season.) This format was retained for the 2011–12 season, albeit with reduced prize money.

For the 2018 season, the TOC format changed again. With a maximum starting field of 80, up to 70 spots are automatically given to entrants with a National PBA Tour title. If the number of entrants tops 70, the list is cut to the most recent title winners, although past winners of the TOC itself retain their automatic entry regardless of when the win occurred. Winners of a PBA Regional, PBA50 Tour, PBA50 Regional or PBA Women's Series title must bowl in an 8-game Pre Tournament Qualifier (PTQ) to earn one of the remaining spots in the opening field. A minimum of 10 spots are filled from the PTQ, but additional spots are made available if the number of automatic entrants is fewer than 70. In 2018, Matt O'Grady became the first player out of the PTQ (with no national PBA Tour titles) to win the Tournament of Champions.

Notable editions

In a notable opening match at the 1967 Tournament of Champions finals, Jack Biondolillo rolled the first-ever nationally televised 300 game. Biondolillo would only tally a 188 score in his next match (a victory), before being eliminated in his third match with a 172 score. Biondolillo's feat was not matched until 2015, when Sean Rash rolled the TOC's second televised perfect game in the second match of the stepladder finals. The tournament has also seen a pair of televised 299 games, by Don Johnson (1970) and Mika Koivuniemi (2011). The 2011 event also featured the lowest-ever game bowled in a nationally televised PBA event as well as the largest pin differential in a PBA match, when Koivuniemi defeated Tom Daugherty in the semifinals, 299–100.

The TOC is the only PBA major that all-time titles leader Walter Ray Williams Jr. has never won.

The 2010–11 Tournament of Champions took place January 16–22, 2011, and featured a $1 million purse and $250,000 first prize, making it the richest PBA tournament ever.  The tournament had an all-new format that included a "Champions Field" and an "Elite Field."  The Champions Field (maximum of 180 bowlers) included any past PBA champions with four or fewer titles, plus titlists on the PBA Regional Tour, PBA Women's Series tour, PBA Senior Tour and PBA Senior Regional Tour who were PBA members at the time of the titles.  The Top 90 finishers after 14 qualifying games advanced to bowl against the Elite Field.  The Elite Field included all 2010–11 exempt PBA players, any PBA Hall of Famer, any player listed in 2008 as one of the "50 Greatest PBA Players of the Last 50 Years," any PBA player with five or more PBA Tour titles or at least one PBA major title, plus the winners of the 2010 USBC Senior Masters, 2010 PBA Senior U.S. Open, 2010 Regional Players Invitational and 2010 Regional Players Championship.  All entrants had to be full-fledged PBA members as of October 1, 2010.

Tournament Winners

2023 Event
The 2023 PBA Tournament of Champions was held March 14–18 at Riviera Lanes in Fairlawn, Ohio, with a pre-tournament qualifier (PTQ) on March 13. The starting field of 64 players included 56 past PBA Tour champions and eight PBA Regional Tour champions who were added out of the PTQ. The total prize fund was $325,000, with a $100,000 winner's share. For the first time in the tournament's history, a 17-player stepladder format was used for the finals. Australia's Jason Belmonte won from the #6 seed position to take his 31st PBA Tour title, defeating top seed E. J. Tackett in the final match. This win marked Belmonte's record-extending 15th major championship and record-setting fourth Tournament of Champions title. 

 *Defeated #5 seed Kyle Troup in extended stepladder to reach the final round.

Prize Pool:
1. Jason Belmonte (Orange, New South Wales, Australia) – $100,000
2. E. J. Tackett (Bluffton, Indiana) – $55,000
3. Anthony Simonsen (Las Vegas, Nevada) – $30,000
4. Matt Ogle (Louisville, Kentucky) – $20,000
5. Jason Sterner (Rochester, New York) – $15,000

Past winners

Jason Thomas' "Top 10 Moments in T of C History"

In 2010, PBA.com writer Jason Thomas listed his Top 10 moments in the 48-year history of the Tournament of Champions.

#10 - Marshall Holman's Million-Dollar Win. Hall of Famer Marshall Holman became the third player in PBA history to top the $1 million mark in career earnings by winning the 1986 event.

#9 - George Branham III Wins Last Firestone. In 1993, George Branham III became the first (and so far only) African American winner in this tournament, as well as the last to win the tournament while it was sponsored by Firestone.

#8 - Weber Becomes Youngest to 10 Titles. With his win in the 1987 T of C, 24-year-old Pete Weber became the youngest PBA player ever to reach the 10-title plateau.

#7 - Earl Gets Title #30. Hall of Fame left-hander Earl Anthony became the first PBA player to reach 30 career titles with his win in the 1978 event.  The legendary Dick Weber, who was in the ABC broadcast booth with Chris Schenkel because analyst Nelson Burton Jr. had made the TV finals, proclaimed Anthony the "undisputed King of Bowling" after the victory.

#6 - Bomb Scare. In 1991, the tournament was delayed 40 minutes due to a bomb threat, which turned out to be a hoax.  David Ozio eventually won the title on his way to 1991 Player of the Year honors.

#5 - Rhino's 4-Count. Rhino Page, needing a 9-spare to defeat Patrick Allen after striking on the first ball in the 10th frame in the 2009 event, left an inexplicable 4-count. Missing wide left of target, Page's shot cut right between the 1 and 4 pins, leaving a bizarre 1-3-4-7-9-10 washout. Though he surprisingly made the spare, he lost to Allen, 267-263.

#4 - Michael Haugen Jr.'s Comeback. Having just qualified for the 2008 T of C earlier that season, Michael Haugen Jr. trailed Chris Barnes by 53 pins in the 5th frame of the final match, and was still down 41 pins entering the 9th frame. When Barnes missed a 10-pin in the 9th frame, Haugen responded with a strike in the 9th and two strikes plus nine pins in the 10th. Barnes rolled a spare in the 10th, and needed a strike on the fill ball to force extra frames.  But Barnes left a 4-pin, giving Haugen a narrow 215-214 victory.

#3 - Couch's Three-Peat. In 2002, Jason Couch became just the second PBA Player to win the T of C three times (joining Mike Durbin) and the only one to do so in consecutive seasons.

#2 - Don Johnson's 299 Game. In perhaps the most iconic moment of the PBA's first 50 years, Hall of Famer Don Johnson had struck on the first nine balls of the final 1970 T of C match, but still needed a mark in the 10th frame to top Dick Ritger's 268 score. With millions watching on TV, Johnson coolly rolled the first two strikes in the 10th to lock up the title. With an additional $10,000 and a Mercury Cougar automobile on the line for a 300-game, Johnson packed his 12th shot but left a ringing 10-pin for a 299 game. The shot of Johnson lying face-down on the approach in disbelief has been replayed dozens of times on PBA telecasts.

#1 - Kelly Kulick's Historic Win. Up against enormous odds to become the first woman ever to win a standard PBA Tour event, it is hard to argue the historic value of Kelly Kulick's 2010 T of C win. Said Thomas, "her inspiring come-from-behind run on Friday evening to qualify for the telecast in second place was probably special enough to make this list. But her performance on Sunday, defeating Mika Koivuniemi and then Chris Barnes with a convincing 265 game in the final with millions watching (the telecast was the PBA's highest-rated show for the year), is a feat that will be remembered for as long as bowling is broadcast on TV."

50th Anniversary "Top Moments" Fan Voting

To commemorate the 50th Tournament of Champions in 2015, a fan poll was conducted to name their top moment in the tournament's history. The top five vote earners included some historic moments that have occurred since Thomas' list was published:

1. Kelly Kulick's win in 2010. (27%)

2. Pete Weber's 2X Triple Crown Win. (16%) Pete Weber's victory in the 2013 event made him the oldest player (50) to win the T of C, as well as the only player to win each event of the PBA's Triple Crown at least twice in a career.

3. Mika Koivuniemi Cashes a Record Winner's Share. (13%) The 2011 Tournament of Champions featured a $1 million purse and a $250,000 first prize (won by Mika Koivuniemi), making it the richest PBA tournament ever. Koivuniemi also won the most lopsided match in PBA finals history, defeating Tom Daugherty 299-100 in the semifinals.

T4. Don Johnson's 299 game in the 1970 final match. (8%)

T4. Jason Couch's three-peat win in 2002. (8%)

References

Sources
 PBA.com site

Ten-pin bowling competitions in the United States